KAVP (1450 AM, "ESPN 1450") is a radio station licensed to serve Colona, Colorado, United States.  The station is owned by Western Slope Communications and the broadcast license is held by WS Communications, LLC.

KAVP broadcasts a sports format as an affiliate of ESPN Radio.

History
This station received its original construction permit from the Federal Communications Commission on April 15, 1997.  The new station was assigned the KAVP call sign by the FCC on June 13, 1997.  After multiple extensions, KAVP finally received its license to cover from the FCC on April 21, 2003.

References

External links
Western Slope Communications

AVP
ESPN Radio stations
Radio stations established in 2001
Montrose County, Colorado
2001 establishments in Colorado